Ariya Phounsavath (born 1 March 1991) is a Laotian cyclist, who currently rides for UCI Continental team . He rode in the road race at the 2016 Summer Olympics.

Major results

2013
 1st Road race, Southeast Asian Games
2014
 2nd Melaka Chief Minister's Cup
 3rd Taiwan KOM Challenge
 5th Overall Tour de Filipinas
1st  Mountains classification
1st Stage 4
2016
 9th Paris–Chauny
2017
 1st  Overall Cúp truyền hình Vietnam
 5th Overall Jelajah Malaysia
 8th Overall Tour de Ijen
2018
 1st  Overall Tour de Indonesia
1st  Mountains classification
 3rd Overall Tour de Singkarak
2019
 10th Overall PRUride PH
2020
 1st  Overall Cambodia Bay Cycling Tour
1st Stage 1
2023
 2nd Overall Tour of Sharjah
 9th Overall New Zealand Cycle Classic

References

External links
 

1991 births
Living people
Laotian male cyclists
Cyclists at the 2016 Summer Olympics
Olympic cyclists of Laos
Cyclists at the 2014 Asian Games
Southeast Asian Games medalists in cycling
Southeast Asian Games medalists for Laos
Cyclists at the 2018 Asian Games
Competitors at the 2013 Southeast Asian Games
Asian Games competitors for Laos
People from Vientiane
Competitors at the 2019 Southeast Asian Games